In the system of Aristotelian logic, the triangle of opposition is a diagram representing the different ways in which each of the three propositions of the system is logically related ('opposed') to each of the others. The system is also useful in the analysis of syllogistic logic, serving to identify the allowed logical conversions from one type to another.

See also 
 Logical cube
 Logical hexagon
 Octagon of Prophecies
 Square of opposition

Diagrams
Term logic
Triangles